Fight the Feeling, released in 2002, is the fourth album by Luis Fonsi, and to date, the only one released in English.

Track listing
 "Fight the Feeling" – 3:39
 "Secret" – 3:48
 "Turn It Up" – 3:33
 "Save Me" – 4:36
 "You Got Nothing on Me" – 3:15
 "If Only" – 4:34
 "Keep My Cool" – 3:13
 "Tell Her Tonight" – 4:06
 "Twisted" – 4:14
 "One Night Thing" – 3:58
 "I Wish" – 4:09

"Keep My Cool" was covered by Korean singer BoA for her song "Spark" in her album My Name which was released in 2004.

Personnel
Johan Åberg – engineer, guitar, keyboards, producer, programming
Humberto Alvarez – stylist
Dow Brain – keyboards, producer, programming
Dean Butterworth – drums
Ron Cadiz – cover photo
Cutfather – producer, remixing
Kara DioGuardi – producer, vocals 
Ryan Dorn – engineer
Luis Fonsi – vocals 
Jon Gass – mixing
Julio Hernandez – bass
Jean-Marie Horvat – mixing
David Irvin – art direction, design
Sebastian Krys – mixing
David Leach – percussion
Jolie Levine-Aller – production coordination
Clyde Lieberman – A&R
Manny Marraquin – mixing
Harvey Mason Jr. – producer
Mischke – engineer, producer, programming, vocal arrangement, vocal producer, vocals 
Steve Morales – producer, programming
Joel Numa – engineer
Esbjörn Öhrwall – guitar
Mario Patiño – production coordination
Dave Pensado – mixing
Betsy Perez – production coordination
Rudy Pérez – guitar, producer
Clay Perry – keyboards, programming
Gen Rubin – drum programming, engineer, keyboards, percussion, producer
Dave Russell – engineer
Jonas Saeed – producer, vocal arrangement
Andy Schlesinger – engineer
David Siegel – keyboards
Brian Steckler – producer, programming
Shane Stoner – engineer
Neil Stubenhaus – bass
Supaflyas – keyboards, producer, programming
Gino Tanabe – stylist
Damon Thomas – producer
Michael Hart Thompson – guitar
Michael Tucker – engineer
Dan Warner – guitar
Bruce Weeden – engineer, mixing
Brad Young – guitar, producer
Sigurd Rosnes – keyboards, programming, vocals

References

2002 albums
Albums produced by the Underdogs (production team)
Luis Fonsi albums